Geometrimima is a monotypic moth genus of the family Erebidae. Its only species, Geometrimima callista, is found in Gabon. Both the genus and the species were first described by William Jacob Holland in 1894.

References

Calpinae
Monotypic moth genera